Bhalwal is a census town in Jammu district in the Indian union territory of Jammu and Kashmir.

References

Cities and towns in Jammu district